Canyon Lake, Lake Canyon, or lakes named "Cañon", may refer to:

Bodies of water
 Canyon Lake (Arizona)
 Canyon Lake (California)
 Canyon Lake (South Dakota)
 Canyon Lake (Texas)
 Canyon Lake (Michigan)
 Lake Canyon (Lakeland, Florida)

Places
 Canyon Lake, California
 Canyon Lake, Texas

See also
 Cannon Lake (disambiguation)
 Canyon (disambiguation)
 Canon (disambiguation)